Tsarevna Marfa Alekseyevna of Russia (26 August 1652 – 19 June 1707) was a Russian princess, daughter of Tsar Alexis of Russia and Maria Miloslavskaya, sister of Tsar Feodor III of Russia and Tsar Ivan V of Russia and half-sister of Tsar Peter the Great. She participated in the rebellion of her sister Sophia against Tsar Peter in 1698, and was therefore imprisoned in a convent. She is an orthodox saint.

References

 Стромилов Н. С. Царевна Марфа, сестра Петра Великого: Историческая биография // Владимирские Губернские ведомости. Часть неофициальная. № 3. 1883. С. 1.

1652 births
1707 deaths
Russian tsarevnas
House of Romanov
Royalty from Moscow
17th-century Russian people
18th-century people from the Russian Empire
17th-century Russian women
18th-century women from the Russian Empire
Children of Alexis of Russia